Kostopil Raion was a raion in Rivne Oblast in western Ukraine. Its administrative center was the town of Kostopil. The raion was abolished and its territory was merged into Rivne Raion on 18 July 2020 as part of the administrative reform of Ukraine, which reduced the number of raions of Rivne Oblast to four. The last estimate of the raion population was

See also
 Subdivisions of Ukraine

References

External links
 rv.gov.ua 

Former raions of Rivne Oblast
1939 establishments in Ukraine
Ukrainian raions abolished during the 2020 administrative reform